What We Did Last Summer – Robbie Williams: Live at Knebworth is a live DVD by Robbie Williams, recorded between 1–3 August 2003 at Knebworth, England, as part of the Weekends of Mass Distraction Tour, the second-last venue on the first leg of the tour.

The album is a DVD companion to the live album Live at Knebworth (also known as Live Summer 2003).

Track listing 
"Let Me Entertain You" (from Life thru a Lens)
"Let Love Be Your Energy" (from Sing When You're Winning)
"We Will Rock You" (from Queen's News of the World)
"Monsoon" (from Escapology)
"Come Undone" (from Escapology)
"Strong" (from I've Been Expecting You)
"Me and My Monkey" (from Escapology)
"Hot Fudge" (from Escapology)
"Mr Bojangles" (from Swing When You're Winning)
"She's the One" (from I've Been Expecting You)
"Supreme" (from Sing When You're Winning)
"No Regrets" (from I've Been Expecting You)
"Kids" (from Sing When You're Winning)
"Better Man" (from Sing When You're Winning)
"Made Up Song"
"Nan's Song" (from Escapology)
"Feel" (from Escapology)
"Rock DJ" (from Sing When You're Winning)
"Angels" (from Life thru a Lens)

The songs "Nan's Song", "Better Man" and "Made Up Song" all feature Robbie Williams on acoustic guitar.

The show's opening with Williams making an entrance hanging upside down on a bungee rope is identical to him doing the same on the cover of his newly released album Escapology. Williams entrance was accompanied by "Let Me Entertain You", a song he often uses as the first song.

As he often does, Williams dedicated his 12th song "No Regrets" to his former Take That bandmates Gary Barlow, Jason Orange, Mark Owen, and Howard Donald.

The performance of "Back for Good" on the third night by Williams and Owen was not included in the main section of the DVD.

Extras 
 Behind the Scenes Documentary: Moments of Mass Distractions
 Fans Diaries
 Interactive Game
 Gallery
 'More Precious Than Gold' – UNICEF film narrated by Robbie Williams

Charts

Weekly charts

Certifications

References 

Robbie Williams video albums
2003 video albums
Films directed by Hamish Hamilton (director)

tr:The Robbie Williams Show